D&E Entertainment is a worldwide independent theatrical film distribution and marketing company founded in 2005 by film and music industry executives Doug Kluthe and Evan Saxon.  The Los Angeles based company theatrically distributes and markets films via digital digitization and distribution of High Definition content for digital cinemas globally in a limited release.  

In June 2010, D&E Entertainment released Rush: Beyond the Lighted Stage in over 100 digital cinemas across the United States.  The film was nominated for a 2011 Grammy Award for Best Long Form Music Video.  Most recent film releases include the 2010 documentary film Last Play at Shea centered on Billy Joel's 2008 final performance at Shea Stadium, before it was demolished and replaced by Citi Field.  The film premiered at the 2010 Tribeca Film Festival.

The company has released concert, documentary, and indie films featuring artists such as Led Zeppelin, Rush, Jimi Hendrix, Pearl Jam, Tom Petty, Bob Marley, Bruce Springsteen, Genesis, Eric Clapton, The Smashing Pumpkins, The Killers, Rihanna, Shakira, Duran Duran, Morrissey, George Michael, Ramones, The Grateful Dead, The Who, Slipknot, and Billy Joel.

Filmography 
 Beneath The Blue (2010), Released Nov. 4, 2010 (Theatrical Distributor)
 The Last Play At Shea (2010), Released Oct. 21, 2010 (Theatrical Distributor)
 Legacy (2010), Released Oct. 15, 2010 (Theatrical Distributor)
 Slipknot: Live At Download (2010), Released Sept. 22, 2010 (Theatrical Distributor)
 Suck (2010), Released Sept. 2, 2010 (Theatrical Distributor)
 Rush: Beyond The Lighted Stage (2010), Released June 10, 2010 (Theatrical Distributor)
 Cheech & Chong's 'Hey Watch This' (2010), Released April 20, 2010 (Theatrical Distributor)
 George Michael: Live In London (2009), Released December 3, 2009 (Theatrical Distributor)
 The Killers: Live From Royal Albert Hall (2009), Released November 4, 2009 (Theatrical Distributor)
 One Fast Move Or I'm Gone: Kerouac's Big Sur (2009), Released October 22, 2009 (Theatrical Distributor)
 Stark Raving Black (2009), Released October 8, 2009 (Theatrical Distributor)

References 

IMDB - D&E Entertainment.

External links 
 D&E Entertainment Distributes Rush Documentary

Companies based in Los Angeles